Roel Santos Martinez (born May 22, 1987) is a Cuban professional baseball outfielder for the Olmecas de Tabasco of the Mexican League and the Alazanes de Granma of the Cuban National Series. He previously played for the Chiba Lotte Marines of Nippon Professional Baseball in 2017.

Career

Québec Capitales
In 2016, Santos played for the Québec Capitales of the Canadian American Association of Professional Baseball. In 78 games for Québec, Santos slashed .301/.370/.353 with 1 home run and 34 RBI.

Chiba Lotte Marines
On May 18, 2017, Santos signed with the Chiba Lotte Marines of Nippon Professional Baseball. In 66 games for the club, Santos hit .250/.282/.356 with 3 home runs and 8 RBI.

Olmecas de Tabasco
On June 21, 2019, Santos signed with the Olmecas de Tabasco of the Mexican League. He did not play in a game in 2020 due to the cancellation of the LMB season because of the COVID-19 pandemic. He later became a free agent. On July 19, 2021, Santos re-signed with the Olmecas.

International career
Santos played for the Cuba national baseball team in the 2014 Central American and Caribbean Games, 2015 Pan American Games, 2017 World Baseball Classic, 2019 Pan American Games, and 2023 World Baseball Classic.

References

External links

1987 births
Living people
Cuban expatriate baseball players in Japan
Baseball outfielders
Québec Capitales players
Olmecas de Tabasco players
2017 World Baseball Classic players
2023 World Baseball Classic players
Alazanes de Granma players
Vegueros de Pinar del Rio players
Baseball players at the 2015 Pan American Games
Baseball players at the 2019 Pan American Games
Pan American Games bronze medalists for Cuba
Nippon Professional Baseball outfielders
Chiba Lotte Marines players
Pan American Games medalists in baseball
Medalists at the 2015 Pan American Games
People from Granma Province
Cuban expatriate baseball players in Canada
Cuban expatriate baseball players in Mexico
Tigres de Aragua players
Cuban expatriate baseball players in Venezuela